Óscar Ramírez Martín (born 1 March 1984 in La Bisbal d'Empordà, Girona, Catalonia) is a Spanish footballer who plays as a right back.

References

External links

1984 births
Living people
People from Baix Empordà
Sportspeople from the Province of Girona
Spanish footballers
Footballers from Catalonia
Association football defenders
Segunda División players
Segunda División B players
UE Figueres footballers
CF Badalona players
Sevilla Atlético players
CE Sabadell FC footballers
SD Ponferradina players
SD Huesca footballers
FC Cartagena footballers
Recreativo de Huelva players